Munsirhat is part of the Jagatballavpur block in the Howrah Sadar subdivision of the Howrah district in the Indian state of West Bengal. The Block Development office is located in Munsirhat.

Geography

Transport
Amta Road (part of State Highway 15) passes through the town. Besides Munsirhat-Udaynarayanpur Road and Munsirhat-Maju Road also start from here.

Bus

Government bus
C11/1 Munsirhat- Howrah
E12 Udaynarayanpur- Esplanade

Public Bus
 E44 Rampur - Howrah Station

Mini Bus
 34 Purash - Howrah Station

Bus Route Without Number
 Pancharul - Howrah Station
 Garbhawanipur- Rubi Hospital

Train
Munsirhat railway station is a station on the Howrah–Amta line of the Kolkata Suburban Railway system. Munsirhat is 30 km from Howrah Station.

Economics
Munsirhat is one of the markets of the district. There are several banks operating in the area including State Bank of India (SBI), Bank of India (BOI), UCO Bank and Indian Bank.

Culture
Munshirhat Sekrahati village is adjacent to the Munsirhat bus stop. There is a century old atchala temple and rasmancha in Ghoshpara in Sekrahati.

Every year, Munsirhat celebrates  Ratha Yatra festival.

Education 
Munshirhat Brahmanpara Chintamoni Institution (Est. in 1923) is the only higher secondary school. There are a number of government aided free primary schools.

References

Cities and towns in Howrah district